Aquimarina celericrescens  is a Gram-negative, aerobic and non-spore-forming bacterium from the genus of Aquimarina which has been isolated from seawater from the Xiaoshi Island from China.

References 

Flavobacteria
Bacteria described in 2018